The 2011–12 Indonesia Super League was the fourth season of the Indonesia Super League (ISL), a fully professional football competition as the top tier of the football league pyramid in Indonesia. The season began on 1 December 2011. Persipura Jayapura were the defending champions, having won their 3rd league title the previous season.

This season was also the first season of ISL organized without authorization from PSSI due to internal conflict. PSSI under chairman Johar Arifin officially decided to replace ISL as a top level with the Indonesian Premier League. It was then recognized by other faction of PSSI under chairman La Nyalla Matalatti.

After the signing of the MoU between Djohar Arifin Husein (PSSI) and La Nyalla Matalitti (KPSI-PSSI) that was initiated by FIFA and the AFC through the AFC force task, Indonesia Super League was under the control of the joint committee to remain manageable by PT Liga Indonesia until the establishment of a new professional competition by the committee.

Teams
Persibo Bojonegoro, Persema Malang, Bontang FC and PSM Makassar were joined to 2011–12 Indonesian Premier League. They were replaced by the best three teams from the 2010–11 Liga Indonesia Premier Division, Persiba Bantul, Mitra Kukar FC and Persiraja Banda Aceh.

Fourth-placed Premier Division sides Persidafon Dafonsoro were promoted to Indonesia Super League after winning the relegation/promotion play-off against 15th placed 2010-11 Indonesia Super League sides Bontang FC by score 3–2.

2010–11 Liga Indonesia Premier Division best-eight teams sides PSAP Sigli, Persiram Raja Ampat, Gresik United and PSMS Medan replaced Persijap Jepara, Semen Padang FC, Persiba Bantul and Persiraja Banda Aceh after those four teams joined to 2011–12 Indonesian Premier League.

Stadium and locations

1 = Ground share with Persipura Jayapura during Persidafon Stadium Barnabas Youwe renovation.
2 = Persiram Raja Ampat was based in Jakarta because they had no stadium representative in Raja Ampat Islands.
3 = PSAP Sigli was based in Banda Aceh for a while since Kuta Asan stadium was being renovated.
4 = The stadium was almost complete renovation, Persiram could use it again on 10 March 2012 as host Persisam Putra Samarinda.

Personnel and kits

Note: Flags indicate national team as has been defined under FIFA eligibility rules. Players and Managers may hold more than one non-FIFA nationality.

In addition, Nike will have a new design for their match ball (white from August to October and March to May; high-visibility yellow from November through February) called Seitiro, featuring a modified flame design.

Coach changes

Pre-season

In season

Foreign players

League table

Results

The fixtures for the Super League were released on 25 November 2011. The season kicked off on 1 December 2011 and is scheduled to conclude on 29 July 2012.

Promotion/relegation play-off 

NB:
(O) = Play-off winner; (P) = Promoted to 2012–13 Indonesia Super League; (R) = Relegated to 2012–13 Liga Indonesia Premier Division.

Season statistics

Top scorers

Own goals

Hat-tricks

 4 Player scored 4 goals

Scoring
First goal of the season: Ricardo Merani for Persiwa Wamena against Gresik United (1 December 2011)
Fastest goal of the season: 13 seconds – Pedro Velázquez for Persija Jakarta against PSAP Sigli (18 April 2012)
Widest winning margin: 6 goals
Persiram Raja Ampat 0–6 Persija Jakarta (11 December 2011)
Persidafon Dafonsoro 6–0 Persiram Raja Ampat (8 May 2012)
Persipura Jayapura 7–1 PSAP Sigli (7 June 2012)
Highest scoring game: 9 goals
Persidafon Dafonsoro 4–5 Persela Lamongan (18 January 2012)
Most goals scored in a match by a single team: 7 goals
Persipura Jayapura 7–1 PSAP Sigli (7 June 2012)
Most goals scored in a match by a losing team: 4 goals
Persidafon Dafonsoro 4–5 Persela Lamongan (18 January 2012)
Widest away winning margin: 6 goals
Persiram Raja Ampat 0–6 Persija Jakarta (11 December 2011)
Most goals scored by an away team: 6 goals
Persiram Raja Ampat 0–6 Persija Jakarta (11 December 2011)
Gresik United 1–6 Pelita Jaya (24 March 2012)

Clean sheets
Most Clean Sheets: 14
Persija Jakarta
Fewest clean sheets: 5
Arema Indonesia
Persiba Balikpapan
Persidafon Dafonsoro

Attendance

References

 
Top level Indonesian football league seasons
Indonesia Super League seasons
Indonesia
1